The UK Rock & Metal Albums Chart is a record chart which ranks the best-selling rock and heavy metal albums in the United Kingdom. Compiled and published by the Official Charts Company, the data is based on each album's weekly physical sales, digital downloads and streams. In 2016, there were 37 albums that topped the 52 published charts. The first number-one album of the year was Alone in the Universe by Jeff Lynne's ELO, which reached the top of the chart for the week ending 26 November 2015 and remained at number one for nine consecutive weeks. The final number-one album of the year was Metallica's tenth studio album Hardwired... to Self-Destruct, which reached number one for the week ending 1 December and remained there for six consecutive weeks into January 2017.

The most successful albums on the UK Rock & Metal Albums Chart in 2016 were Metallica's Hardwired... to Self-Destruct and Disturbed's 2015 release Immortalized, both of which spent a total of five weeks at number one during the year. Hardwired... to Self-Destruct was the best-selling rock and metal album of the year, ranking 56th in the UK End of Year Albums Chart and receiving a gold certification from the British Phonographic Industry. Biffy Clyro's seventh studio album Ellipsis spent four weeks at number one during 2016, and finished as the 59th best-selling album in the UK at the end of the year. Alone in the Universe by Jeff Lynne's ELO spent three weeks at number one, while two albums – Killswitch Engage's Incarnate and Avenged Sevenfold's The Stage – spent two weeks at number one.

Chart history

See also
2016 in British music
List of UK Rock & Metal Singles Chart number ones of 2016

References

External links
Official UK Rock & Metal Albums Chart Top 40 at the Official Charts Company
The Official UK Top 40 Rock Albums at BBC Radio 1

2016 in British music
United Kingdom Rock and Metal Albums
2016